is a sub-temple of the temple complex of Myōshin-ji in Kyoto, Japan. As such, it is affiliated with the Myōshin-ji school of Rinzai Zen Buddhism.

Name 
The temple is named for Donglin Temple at the base of Mountain Lu near Jiujiang in China.

A festival is held every June to celebrate the sal tree and its flowers.

History 
The temple was founded in 1531 in Kamigyō-ku as a family temple for the Hosokawa clan, and named . In 1556, it passed to the Yamana clan, whose family temple it remains to this day, and was moved to its current location within Myōshin-ji and renamed to Tōrin-in.

Visiting 
The temple is not generally open to walk-up visitors, but is open year-round for shukubō (monastery lodging, reservations by return postcard) and shōjin-ryōri (devotional cuisine, 3 or more people). The current head priest,  is a noted researcher on devotional cuisine, frequently appearing on television and in magazine articles, and a class on devotional cuisine is held every Tuesday.

Further, the temple holds three annual events, which are open to the public (admission charged, reservations not required):
  – second half of January, from January 15, celebrating  (daytime, devotional cuisine meal)
  – second half of June (daytime, with tea or with devotional cuisine meal)
  – early/mid-October (10 days, from first or second Friday, 6–9 pm)

External links 
 塔頭寺院案内 東林院 (sub-temple information: Tōrin-in)  
 東林院, JR (Japan Rail) information page on temple and sal tree festival

Events 
 東林院・小豆粥で初春を祝う会 (Adzuki-bean gruel festival, Kyoto Tourism) 
 小豆粥で初春を祝う会 2012（東林院） (blog post) 
 東林院・沙羅の花を愛でる会 (Sal tree festival, Kyoto Tourism) 
 沙羅双樹の寺　東林院　沙羅の花を愛でる (blog post) 
 東林院　「沙羅の花を愛でる会」　最終日 (blog post) 
 東林院・梵燈のあかりに親しむ会 (Lantern festival, Kyoto Tourism) 
 東林院で「梵燈のあかりに親しむ会」 (Lantern festival, Yomiuri, video) 
 ７日から東林院で「梵燈のあかりに親しむ会」 (Lantern festival, Kyoto Newspaper) 

Buddhist temples in Kyoto
Rinzai temples